Vahe Hakobyan may refer to:

 Vahe A. Hakobyan (born 1971), Armenian politician
 Vahe M. Hakobyan (born 1977), Armenian politician